Wuyuan railway station is a railway station of Hefei–Fuzhou high-speed railway in Wuyuan County, Jiangxi.

A statue of Zhan Tianyou, the pioneering Chinese railway engineer of Wuyuan origin, stands in front of the station.

History
This station commenced services with Hefei-Fuzhou HSR on June 28, 2015. It became a junction with the opening of the Jiujiang–Quzhou railway on 28 December 2017.

References

Railway stations in Jiangxi
Railway stations in China opened in 2015